Bulgaria–Canada relations are the Interstate relations between Bulgaria and Canada that were established in 1966.

Overview 

Canada's Ambassador in Bucharest is accredited to Bulgaria, while an Honorary Consulate in Sofia assists Canadian interests in Bulgaria. Bulgaria has an embassy in Ottawa and a consulate-general in Toronto. Bulgarian-born Canadian businessman, construction magnate and philanthropist Ignat Kaneff was the Honorary Consul of Bulgaria in Canada.

Canada and Bulgaria enjoy very good bilateral relations, highlighted by shared membership in la Francophonie. There is increasing trade and investment, effective military and security cooperation, and growing academic and cultural relations between the two countries.

Canada's Honorary Consul in Sofia plays an active role in fostering political, commercial and cultural relations between Canada and Bulgaria. His office offers consular support to Canadian citizens as well as Trade Commissioner Services and support in Bulgaria.

More than 30,000 Canadians of Bulgarian origin live in Canada and have made unique and valuable contributions to Canada. Approximately 1,000 Canadians live permanently in Bulgaria and up to 15,000 Canadians visited Bulgaria in 2011.

Trade relations 
Bulgaria is one of Canada's largest merchandise trade partners in South East Europe with bilateral trade reaching $369.3 million in 2012. Canadian companies are important to Bulgaria's mining industry and are showing interest in the oil and gas sector in both onshore and offshore exploration. Business opportunities for Canadian companies exist in Bulgaria in telecommunications, airport services, electrical generation and agriculture.

Bilateral treaties and agreements 

 Double Taxation Avoidance Agreement, which was signed on March 3, 1999.

See also 
 Foreign relations of Bulgaria
 Foreign relations of Canada
 Canada–European Union relations
 Comprehensive Economic and Trade Agreement
 European Union–NATO relations

References 

 
Canada
Bilateral relations of Canada